Draconanthes (from Greek, "dragon flower") is a genus of orchids, comprising two species. These have rigid, fleshy sepals and fleshy petals with a thick lip, and are borne on successively flowered racemes. One species is endemic to Ecuador, the other is found through the Andes at high elevations.

These two species were previously included in the genus Lepanthes.

References

Pleurothallidinae
Orchids of South America
Orchids of Ecuador
Pleurothallidinae genera